The Kosovar Cup is the major football national cup tournament in Kosovo. It was established in 1991, and is organized by the Football Federation of Kosovo. 
Llapi are the current holders, who won their second Kosovar Cup against Drita at the 2021-2022 Kosovar Cup Final held at the Fadil Vokrri Stadium.

Cup finals

Independent football association
 1991–92 Trepça 
 1992–93 Flamurtari 1-0 Trepça
 1993–94 Prishtina 2-1 Vëllaznimi
 1994–95 Prishtina 1-0 Dukagjini
 1995–96 Flamurtari 2–1 Dukagjini 
 1996–97 2 Korriku w/o Gjilani 
 1997–98 tournament not held
 1998–99 tournament not held

Reestablished after establishment of UNMIK
 1999–00 Gjilani 1-0 Besiana
 2000–01 Drita 1-1 Gjilani [aet, 5-4 pen]
 2001–02 Besiana 2–1 Gjilani 
 2002–03 KEK 3–1 Prishtina
 2003–04 Kosova Prishtinë 1–0 Besa Pejë 
 2004–05 Besa Pejë 3–2 KEK
 2005–06 Prishtina 1–1 Drenica [aet, 5-4 pen]
 2006–07 Liria 0–0 Flamurtari [aet, 3-0 pen]
 2007–08 Vëllaznimi 2–0 Trepça'89

After the declaration of independence
 2008–09 Hysi 2–1 Prishtina 
 2009–10 Liria 2–1 Vëllaznimi 
 2010–11 Prishtina 1–2 Besa Pejë 
 2011–12 Trepça'89 3–0 Ferizaj 
 2012–13 Prishtina 1–1 Ferizaj [aet, 4–3 pen]
 2013–14 Hajvalia 1–2 Feronikeli
 2014–15 Feronikeli 1-1 Trepça'89 [aet, 5-4 pen]
 2015–16 Prishtina 2–1 Drita

After UEFA recognition 
 2016–17 Llapi 1–1 Besa [aet, 2–4 pen]
 2017–18 Vëllaznimi 1–1 Prishtina [aet, 4–5 pen]
 2018–19 Feronikeli 5–1 Trepça'89
 2019–20 Prishtina 1–0 Ballkani
 2020–21 Dukagjini 1–1 Llapi [aet, 3–4 pen]
 2021–22 Llapi 2–1 FC Drita

Performance by club

References

 
Football competitions in Kosovo
Recurring sporting events established in 1991
1991 establishments in Kosovo